The 2002 Walsall Metropolitan Borough Council election took place on 2 May 2002 to elect members of Walsall Metropolitan Borough Council in the West Midlands, England. One third of the council was up for election and the council stayed under no overall control.

Background
Before the election the council was run by a coalition between the Conservative and Liberal Democrat parties, after Labour had run the council from 1995 to 2000. The candidates at the election were 20 each from the Labour and Conservative parties, 10 Liberal Democrats, 7 independents, 4 UK Independence Party and 3 Green Party.

A significant issue at the election was a report from the Audit Commission in January 2002, which had made many criticisms of the council, with the council having almost been taken over by the national government 2 months before the election.

Election result

Ward results

References

2002 English local elections
2002
2000s in the West Midlands (county)